Ghantapada is a census town in Angul district  in the state of Odisha, India.

Demographics
 India census, Ghantapada had a population of 15,587. Males constitute 54% of the population and females 46%. Ghantapada has an average literacy rate of 71%, higher than the national average of 59.5%: male literacy is 78%, and female literacy is 63%. In Ghantapada, 14% of the population is under 6 years of age.

References

Cities and towns in Angul district